Calicnemia is a genus of damselflies in the family Platycnemididae. There are over 20 species distributed in Southeast Asia, China, India, and Pakistan.

Species include:

Calicnemia chaoi
Calicnemia chaseni
Calicnemia doonensis
Calicnemia erythromelas
Calicnemia eximia
Calicnemia fortis
Calicnemia gulinensis
Calicnemia haksik
Calicnemia imitans
Calicnemia miles
Calicnemia miniata
Calicnemia mortoni
Calicnemia mukherjeei
Calicnemia nipalica
Calicnemia porcata
Calicnemia pulverulans
Calicnemia rectangulata
Calicnemia sinensis
Calicnemia soccifera
Calicnemia sudhaae
Calicnemia uenoi
Calicnemia zhuae

References

Platycnemididae
Zygoptera genera